The Hotel Whitney is a historic building located in Atlantic, Iowa, United States.  The three-story Victorian Era brick building was completed in 1890.  The structure was built so that it could rise to as many as 10-stories. It was also a designated bomb shelter in southwest Iowa.  It features a raised parapet in the middle of the main facade.  The building is in the process of being converted into 18 senior apartments on the top two floors. The main floor will be converted into a restaurant specializing in breakfast and lunch.  The building was listed on the National Register of Historic Places in 2016.

References

Hotel buildings completed in 1890
Atlantic, Iowa
Buildings and structures in Cass County, Iowa
National Register of Historic Places in Cass County, Iowa
Hotel buildings on the National Register of Historic Places in Iowa